The compound of two great icosahedra is a uniform polyhedron compound. It's composed of 2 great icosahedra, in the same arrangement as in the compound of 2 icosahedra.

The triangles in this compound decompose into two orbits under action of the symmetry group: 16 of the triangles lie in coplanar pairs in octahedral planes, while the other 24 lie in unique planes.

The great icosahedron, as a uniform retrosnub tetrahedron , is similar to these snub-pair compounds: compound of two icosahedra, compound of two snub cubes and compound of two snub dodecahedra.

References 
.

External links 
 VRML model: 

Polyhedral compounds